Cerro Colorado is a stratovolcano that lies in northern Chile about  west of the border with Bolivia and approximately the same distance southwest of the Putana Volcano. 
Cerro Colorado is located immediately west of Cerro Curiquinca and northwest of volcán Escalante (El Apagado); all three mountains are considered to be part of the Sairecabur volcanic group.

See also
List of volcanoes in Bolivia
List of volcanoes in Chile

References
 
 (Spanish)

External links
 SI Google Earth Placemarks - Smithsonian Institution Global Volcanism Program: Download placemarks with SI  Holocene volcano-data.

Volcanoes of Antofagasta Region
Stratovolcanoes of Chile
Mountains of Chile